Hans Schilling may refer to:

 Hans Schilling, son of Klewi Schilling, see Schilling of Solothurn
 Hans Schilling (aviator) (1892–1916), World War I German observer flying ace